Warren G. Abrahamson is an American biologist, currently at Bucknell University and an Elected Fellow of the American Association for the Advancement of Science.

References

Year of birth missing (living people)
Living people
Fellows of the American Association for the Advancement of Science
Bucknell University faculty
21st-century American biologists